Larry Teal (26 March 1905 - 11 July 1984) is considered by many to be the father of American orchestral saxophone.

Career 
Laurence Lyon Teal earned a bachelor's degree in pre-dentistry from the University of Michigan. Although he came to the University of Michigan to study dentistry, he soon became involved with Wilson's Wolverines—a jazz band with a more than local following. He toured Europe with them for several years and later returned to the States only to be recruited by Glen Gray's Casa Loma Orchestra of Detroit, one of the important society orchestras of the period. He later earned a Doctor of Music from the Detroit Institute of Musical Arts in 1943.

Teal carved out his own niche in Detroit's musical life. He was a member of radio station WJR's live studio orchestra and he was a member of the Detroit Symphony Orchestra (DSO) from 1943 to 1964. Not only did he play sax, as one might expect, but he also performed on clarinet and was the DSO's first desk flutist, a rare enough feat then and almost unheard of now. Additionally, he opened his own music studio and staffed it with players from the orchestra. It was one of the most reputable, demanding and prestigious of its kind in the country. His studio near Wayne University where many high school and collegiate students studied saxophone. Don Sinta was one of those students who was considered a virtuoso in saxophone by many while he was a music major at Wayne. Mr. Teal was highly sought after as a professional musician by both classical and popular musical organizations.

He became the first full-time professor of saxophone at any American university when he was appointed to the faculty of the University of Michigan-Ann Arbor in 1953. He remained the professor of saxophone there until he retired in 1974, at which time he was given the title "professor emeritus."

During his 21 years at the university, Teal taught over 100 college saxophone students, many of whom went on to become successful teachers and performers. In this way he had an unusual degree of influence over the direction and quality of classical saxophone teaching in America.

Notable students
His students included:
Donald Sinta, who succeeded him as professor of saxophone at the University of Michigan
Steven Mauk, professor of saxophone at Ithaca College
Patrick Meighan, retired professor of saxophone at Florida State University
John Sampen, now professor of saxophone at Bowling Green State University
Joe Henderson
Josh Rodriguez
John Nichol, professor of saxophone at Central Michigan University
Jerry D. Luedders, professor of music and saxophone at California State University, Northridge
Fred W. Becker, Musician and Teacher
Randall E. Reese, Associate Professor of Music at Armstrong Atlantic State University
Max Plank, retired professor of saxophone at Eastern Michigan University
David Henderson, professor of saxophone at University of the Pacific
Kenny Millions
Larry Teal Jr.
Yusef Lateef
Bennie Maupin, adjunct faculty at CalArts (California Institute of the Arts)
Lynn Klock, retired professor of saxophone at University of Massachusetts Amherst

Books
Teal wrote several books for use by saxophone students and teachers, including:
The Art of Saxophone Playing (1963) 
 Melodies for the Young Saxophonist
The Saxophonist's Workbook (need ISBN)
'' Daily Studies for the Improvement of the Saxophone Technique

References 

 "Musician? It's Not Logical." Ann Arbor News, May 9, 1974. Print. 
 "Recital to honor man who made the saxophone 'legit.'" Ann Arbor News, January 18, 1985. Print.
 The Art of Saxophone Playing by Larry Teal, Google Books Preview.

1905 births
1984 deaths
Classical saxophonists
American classical saxophonists
American male saxophonists
University of Michigan faculty
University of Michigan alumni
20th-century classical musicians
20th-century American saxophonists
20th-century American male musicians